Boothose (boot-hose, boot hose) are over-stockings or boot liners worn in the sixteenth and seventeenth centuries to protect fine knitted stockings from wear. They first appear around 1450.

Originally a practical item, they were later made of fine linen and sported elaborate lace and embroidered boothose tops.  By 1583 Philip Stubbs in his Anatomie of Abuses could decry "The vain excesse of botehosen" 

In the 17th century, linen boothose could be trimmed with lavish lace tops turned down over cuffed bucket-topped boots.  In mid-century, it was briefly stylish to wear boothose with low-cut shoes, before boothose fell completely out of fashion. They lingered, once again a practical object, under the name boot stockings into the 18th century.

See also
1600–1650 in fashion
1650–1700 in fashion

References

Ribeiro, Aileen: Fashion and Fiction: Dress in Art and Literature in Stuart England, Yale, 2005, 

Undergarments
Hosiery
History of clothing (Western fashion)